Galt is a ghost town in central Galt Township, Rice County, Kansas, United States.

History
Circa 1910, Galt contained a general store and 15 inhabitants. It was a shipping point on the Atchison, Topeka, and Santa Fe railroad.  The post office in Galt closed in 1911.  Currently, no structures remain of this former community.

References

Further reading

Unincorporated communities in Kansas
Unincorporated communities in Rice County, Kansas